George T. French  Jr. is the fifth president of Clark Atlanta University in downtown Atlanta, serving since September 2019. He previously served as the 14th president of Miles College from 2006 until August 2019.

Education
French earned BA in Political Science from the University of Louisville and attended University of Richmond School of Law for two year, but was recruited by Miles College to serve as the Director of Development. He earned his JD at Miles Law School. He also has a PhD in Higher Education from Jackson State University.

References

Year of birth missing (living people)
Place of birth missing (living people)
Living people
American academic administrators
Miles College people